Yemva (Jemva) is a town and the administrative center of Knyazhpogostsky District of the Komi Republic, Russia, located on the Vym River  northeast of Syktyvkar. Population:

History
It was founded as a settlement around the railway station of Knyazhpogost. It was granted urban-type settlement status and renamed Zheleznodorozhny in 1941. In 1985, it was granted town status and renamed Yemva, which is the local name for the Vym River.

Administrative and municipal status
Within the framework of administrative divisions, Yemva serves as the administrative center of Knyazhpogostsky District. As an administrative division, it is, together with nine rural localities, incorporated within Knyazhpogostsky District as Yemva Town of District Significance Administrative Territory. As a municipal division, Yemva Town of District Significance Administrative Territory is incorporated within Knyazhpogostsky Municipal District as Yemva Urban Settlement.

Sport
Yemva has a bandy club that plays in a recreational league.

References

Sources

Cities and towns in the Komi Republic
Cities and towns built in the Soviet Union
Yarensky Uyezd